Boro language may refer to:

 Boro language (India), a Tibeto-Burman language spoken in Assam, India
 Boro language (Ghana), an extinct and unclassified language of Ghana
 Boro language (Ethiopia), an Omotic language of Ethiopia